Alpeite (IMA symbol: Apt) is a calcium manganese magnesium silicate mineral with the chemical formula CaMnAl(MnMg)(SiO)(SiO)(VO)(OH). It is named for its type locality, the Monte Alpe mine in Italy.

References 

Calcium minerals
Manganese(III) minerals
Magnesium minerals
Silicate minerals